The Kamchatkan rainbow trout (Oncorhynchus mykiss mykiss) is a subspecies of the rainbow trout, which is a fish in the family Salmonidae. It is native to Russian Far East. Its main range is on the Kamchatka Peninsula, and it has also been recorded from the Commander Islands east of Kamchatka, and sporadically in the Sea of Okhotsk, as far south as the mouth of the Amur River.

Sea-run and freshwater ecotypes
The Kamchatkan rainbow trout ("mikizha") comprises various ecological forms, including anadromous and resident freshwater forms and their intermediates.  Russian taxonomy has long attributed the rainbow trout to the genus Parasalmo, and has further considered the Kamchatkan rainbow trout as composed of two distinct species, Parasalmo mykiss and Parasalmo  penshinensis, whose ranges overlap. P. mykiss is a resident freshwater and estuary form, whereas P. penshinensis, "Kamchatkan salmon", is the sea-run, migrating anadromous form, which  may grow to a length of 100 cm and 11–12 kg weight (as with the American steelhead). P. penshinensis is considered critically endangered (CR) in the Red Book of Kamchatka. Modern research however suggests that the two forms represent the same species, showing no genetic isolation or differences.

References

Oncorhynchus
Fish described in 1792
Taxa named by Johann Julius Walbaum